Sicklauddsbron (Swedish: "The Bridge of Cape Sickla") or Apatêbron ("Bridge Apatê") is a bridge in central Stockholm, Sweden. It stretches over Sickla kanal in Södra Hammarbyhamnen.  The name Sickla is believed to be derived from a 15th-century provincial word, sik, meaning "minor marsh".  The bridge is named Apatê, a Greek word meaning mirage or illusion.  Designed by the architects Magnus Ståhl,  Erik Andersson (architect), and Jelena Mijanovic, it was awarded the European Steel Design Award in 2003.

Sicklauddsbron is a stainless steel pedestrian bridge, 62 metres in length.   The load-bearing sections are made of 80 tonnes hot-rolled duplex stainless steel gauge plates, 25 mm thick, which were water cut, flanged, and welded before being reassembled on the site. From the concrete abutments tension cables stretches the central part of the bridge, an arched box girder triangular in section. The lighting is built-in into the stainless steel handrails, while the pathway is covered with asphalt.

See also 
 List of bridges in Stockholm
 Danviksbron
 Sickla kanalbro

References

External links 
 steelconstruct.com - Bridge Apatê Brief description. 
 ljusdesign.com - Pedestrian bridge "Apatê" - Night view of the bridge. 
 - Erik Andersson Architects"  

Bridges in Stockholm
Pedestrian bridges in Sweden